"I Do (Cherish You)" is a song  written by Keith Stegall and Dan Hill. It was first released in February 1998 by American country music artist Mark Wills. The first single from his second album Wish You Were Here, it became his third top ten hit on the US Billboard Hot Country Singles & Tracks (now Hot Country Songs) chart that year.

Music video
Mark Wills' music video, directed by Peter Zavadil and shown in black-and-white, features Wills inside a train station. The video ends with his love coming in the doors, and he gives her an engagement ring. The music video for the 98 Degrees version, directed by Wayne Isham, features the members of the band separately dating a lady played by Ali Landry. At the end of the video, she marries a gentleman played by Dustin Diamond, much to the chagrin of the four band members.

Track listing
CD single
 "I Do (Cherish You)" – 3:17
 "You Can't Go Wrong Loving Me" – 3:05

Charts

Weekly charts

Year-end charts

98 Degrees version

In July 1999, American vocal group 98 Degrees released a cover of the song as the fourth and final single from their second album, 98 Degrees and Rising. Their version peaked at number 13 on the Billboard Hot 100. It was also included on the soundtrack for the 1999 romantic film Notting Hill. It also appeared on the NBC Saturday morning television sitcom City Guys, where the group performed at the school courtyard in the episode "Dance Fever".

Track listings
German maxi-CD single
 "I Do (Cherish You)" (radio edit) – 3:45
 "I Do (Cherish You)" (Love to Infinity Radio Mix) – 3:31
 "I Do (Cherish You)" (Love to Infinity Master Mix) – 5:35
 "Because of You" (Hex Hector Dance Mix) – 3:04

Charts

Weekly charts

Year-end charts

Release history

References

1990s ballads
1998 singles
1998 songs
1999 singles
98 Degrees songs
Country ballads
Mark Wills songs
Mercury Nashville singles
Motown singles
Music videos directed by Peter Zavadil
Music videos directed by Wayne Isham
Pop ballads
Song recordings produced by Carson Chamberlain
Songs written by Dan Hill
Songs written by Keith Stegall
Universal Records singles